Lasius plumopilosus is a species of ant belonging to the genus Lasius, formerly a part of the genus (now a subgenus) Acanthomyops. Described in 1941 by Buren, the species is native to the United States, notably from the state of Iowa.

References

External links

plumopilosus
Hymenoptera of North America
Insects of the United States
Insects described in 1941